Searight's Fulling Mill is a historic fulling mill located at Perryopolis, Fayette County, Pennsylvania, USA. It was built about 1810 and is a 2 1/2-story, sandstone building with a gable roof. The mill closed in the 1820s and was converted to a dwelling.

It was added to the National Register of Historic Places in 1973.

The mill is named after William Searight, who built the mill on a farm previously owned by George Washington. Searight is credited for realizing that small fulling mills could not compete with city based factories served by railroads, and left the fulling business before his mills became unprofitable.

References

Grinding mills in Pennsylvania
Grinding mills on the National Register of Historic Places in Pennsylvania
Industrial buildings completed in 1810
Buildings and structures in Fayette County, Pennsylvania
National Register of Historic Places in Fayette County, Pennsylvania